The Temple Owls football program from 1894 to 1899 was led by two head coaches: Charles M. Williams was the head coach from 1894 to 1898 and compiled a 13–15–1 record; and John T. Rogers was the head coach from 1899 to 1901 and compiled a 4–8–2 record.

1894

The 1894 Temple Owls football team was an American football team that represented Temple University as an independent during the 1894 college football season. In its first season under head coach Charles M. Williams, the team compiled a 4–1 record.

Schedule

1895

The 1895 Temple Owls football team was an American football team that represented Temple University as an independent during the 1895 college football season. In its second season under head coach Charles M. Williams, the team compiled a 1–4–1 record.

Schedule

1896

The 1896 Temple Owls football team was an American football team that represented Temple University as an independent during the 1896 college football season. In its third season under head coach Charles M. Williams, the team compiled a 3–2 record.

Schedule

1897

The 1897 Temple Owls football team was an American football team that represented Temple University as an independent during the 1897 college football season. In its fourth season under head coach Charles M. Williams, the team compiled a 3–3 record.

Schedule

1898

The 1898 Temple Owls football team was an American football team that represented Temple University as an independent during the 1898 college football season. In its fifth and final season under Charles M. Williams, the team compiled a 2–5 record.

Schedule

1899

The 1899 Temple Owls football team was an American football team that represented Temple University as an independent during the 1899 college football season. In its first season under head coach John T. Rogers, the team compiled a 1–4–1 record.

Schedule

References

1894
Temple
Temple
Temple
Temple
Temple
Temple